Watsonian FC Ladies is a women's rugby union team based in Edinburgh and part of the Scottish Rugby Union. The club is part of Watsonians RFC and plays at the club's home ground of Myreside Road, Edinburgh.

Squads

Watsonians have one ladies team who play in the Ladies Tennents Premiership. In season 2018/19 they have also begun a girls section from u12 - u18 level. 

Formed in 2001 by a number of players from different clubs around the city, the team played in Premier league for most of their existence and also in National 1- last winning that competition in the 2016/17 season. Following promotion to the Premiership again in 2017/18 Watsonians ladies have established themselves again at that level and in season 2017/18 were runners up in the Sarah Beaney Cup. 

Coaches - Freddie Main, Scott Nightingale, Duncan Wilson

Previous Seasons

2018/19 - Dave Flynn, Scott Nightingale

2017/18 - Tristan Gray, Scott Nightingale, Dave Flynn

2016/17 - Tristan Gray, Scott Nightingale,  Euan Lyster

2015/16 - Tristan Gray

2014/15 - Baz Lawson and Freddie Main

History - Last 5 Years

Season 2012/13 - 5th in Premier League

Season 2013/14 - 6th in Premier League

Season 2014/15 - 6th in National League 1

                              Bowl Winners

Season 2015/16 - 6th in National League 1
                              Plate Winners

Season 2016/17 - 1st in National League 1 
                              Cup Quarter Finalists

Season 2017/18 - 5th in Premier League (1st In Prem B split)
                              Cup Finalists

List of Watsonian Ladies Scotland Caps

Lana Skeldon - Nicola Nightingale - Emma Evans - Karen Dunbar - Alex Pratt-- MP Tierney - Jilly McCord - Sarah Mee - Keri Holdsworth - Kath Vass

Scotland 7s Internationalist Section
Bryony Nelson

See also
 Rugby union in Scotland
 Scottish National League
 The Scottish 2nd XV League
 Scottish Women's Rugby

References

External links
 

Scottish rugby union teams
Rugby union in Edinburgh
Sports teams in Edinburgh